The olive-backed flowerpecker (Prionochilus olivaceus) is a species of bird in the family Dicaeidae.
It is endemic to the Philippines.

Its natural habitat is subtropical or tropical moist lowland forest.

References

olive-backed flowerpecker
Endemic birds of the Philippines
olive-backed flowerpecker
Taxonomy articles created by Polbot